Leonard Cyril Deighton (born 18 February 1929) is a British author. His publications have included cookery books, history and military history, but he is best known for his spy novels.

After completing his national service in the Royal Air Force, Deighton attended art school in London, and graduated from the Royal College of Art in 1955. He had several jobs before becoming a book and magazine illustrator—including designing the cover for first UK edition of Jack Kerouac's 1957 work On the Road. He also worked for a period in an advertising agency. During an extended holiday in France he wrote his first novel, The IPCRESS File, which was published in 1962, and was a critical and commercial success. He wrote several spy novels featuring the same central character, an unnamed working-class intelligence officer, cynical and tough.

Between 1962 and 1966 Deighton was the food correspondent for The Observer and drew cookstrips—black and white graphic recipes with a limited number of words. A selection of these were collected and published in 1965 as Len Deighton's Action Cook Book, the first of five cookery books he wrote. Other topics of non-fiction include history, particularly military history.

Several of Deighton's works have been adapted for film and other media. Films include The Ipcress File (1965), Funeral in Berlin (1966), Billion Dollar Brain (1967) and Spy Story (1976). In 1988 Granada Television produced the miniseries Game, Set and Match based on his trilogy of the same name, and in 1995 BBC Radio 4 broadcast a "real time" dramatisation of his novel Bomber.

Biography

Early life and early career: 1929–1961
Deighton was born in Marylebone, London, on 18 February 1929. His father was the chauffeur and mechanic for Campbell Dodgson, the Keeper of Prints and Drawings at the British Museum; Deighton's mother was a part-time cook. At the time the family lived in Gloucester Place Mews near Baker Street. In 1940, at the age of eleven, Deighton witnessed the arrest of Anna Wolkoff, a British subject of Russian descent for whom his mother cooked; Wolkoff was detained as a Nazi spy and charged with stealing correspondence between Winston Churchill and Franklin D. Roosevelt. Deighton later said that observing her arrest was "a major factor in my decision to write a spy story at my first attempt at fiction".

Deighton was educated at St Marylebone Grammar School, but was moved to an emergency school for part of the Second World War. After leaving school, Deighton worked as a railway clerk before being conscripted at the age of 17 for national service, which he completed with the Royal Air Force. While in the RAF he was trained as a photographer, often recording crime scenes as part of his duties.

After two and a half years with the RAF, Deighton received a demobilisation grant, enabling him to study at the Saint Martin's School of Art where he won a scholarship to the Royal College of Art, graduating from the latter in 1955. He worked as a flight attendant for British Overseas Airways Corporation (BOAC) between 1956 and 1962 before becoming a professional illustrator. Much of his work as an illustrator was in advertising—he worked for agencies in New York and London—but he also illustrated magazines and over 200 book covers, including for the first UK edition of Jack Kerouac's 1957 work On the Road.

Publishing career: 1961–

Following the publication of a cartoon cookery illustration in the Daily Express in 1961, Deighton was commissioned by The Observer to provide a "Cookstrip" for the paper's magazine, which he did between March 1962 and August 1966. Deighton had come up with the concept while he was at art school and working as a porter in the restaurant of the Royal Festival Hall, where he had occasionally assisted the chefs in preparing dishes. He made sketches to remember some of the steps he undertook. He later explained:

I was buying expensive cookbooks. I'm very messy, and didn't want to take them into the kitchen. So I wrote out the recipes on paper, and it was easier for me to draw three eggs than write 'three eggs'. So I drew three eggs, then put in an arrow. For me it was a natural way to work.

In 1962 Deighton's first novel, The IPCRESS File, was published; it had been written in 1960 while he was staying in the Dordogne; the book was soon a commercial success. The story introduced an unnamed working-class protagonist, cynical and tough, who was called by the name "Harry" once, although the character says he does not remember whether he had used that name; he was given the name Harry Palmer in the 1965 film adaptation.

Deighton sees the character not as an anti-hero, but as "a romantic, incorruptible figure in the mould of Philip Marlowe". Deighton described the inspiration of using a working-class spy among the Oxbridge-educated members of the Establishment as coming from his time at the London advertising agency, when he was the only member of the company's board not to have been educated at Eton. He said "The IPCRESS File is about spies on the surface, but it's also really about a grammar school boy among public school boys and the difficulties he faces."

After two further novels with his unnamed protagonist—Horse Under Water (1963) and Funeral in Berlin (1964)—Deighton published two cookbooks in 1965, Len Deighton's Action Cook Book (a collection of his cookstrips from The Observer) and Où est le garlic, a collection of French recipes. Two further novels in the spy series then followed—Billion-Dollar Brain (1966) and An Expensive Place to Die (1967)— after which he published his first historical non-fiction work, The Assassination of President Kennedy (1967), co-written with M. Rand and H. Lockston. In September that year he wrote an article in The Sunday Times Magazine about Operation Snowdrop, an SAS attack on Benghazi during the Second World War. The following year David Stirling, the leader of the raid, was awarded substantial damages in libel from the article. During the mid-1960s Deighton wrote for Playboy as a travel correspondent, and he provided a piece on the boom in spy fiction; An Expensive Place to Die  was serialised in the magazine in 1967.

In 1968, Deighton was the producer of the film Only When I Larf, which was based on his novel of the same name. He was the writer and co-producer of Oh! What a Lovely War in 1969, but did not enjoy the process of making films, and had his name removed from the film's credits.

In 1970 Deighton wrote Bomber, a fictional account of an RAF Bomber Command raid that goes wrong. To produce the novel he used an IBM MT/ST, and it is likely that this was the first novel to be written using a word processor. Deighton's next non-fictional work, Fighter: The True Story of the Battle of Britain, was published in 1977. This was followed in 1978 by another novel, SS-GB, the idea for which came from Ray Hawkey, Deighton's friend from art school and the designer of the covers of several of his books. While the two were discussing what would have happened if the Germans had won the Second World War, Hawkey asked Deighton if he thought there could be an alternative history novel.

From 1983 Deighton wrote three trilogies: Berlin Game (1983), Mexico Set (1984) and London Match (1985); Spy Hook (1988), Spy Line (1989) and Spy Sinker (1990); and Faith (1994), Hope (1995) and Charity (1996). Winter, a companion novel dealing with the lives of a German family from 1899 to 1945, which also provides an historical background to several of the characters from the trilogies, was published in 1987. The trilogies are centred on Bernard Samson, a tough, cynical and disrespectful MI6 intelligence officer.

Personal life
Deighton married the illustrator Shirley Thompson in 1960; the couple were divorced in 1976, having not lived together for over five years. He left Britain in 1969, and has lived abroad since, including in Ireland, Austria, France, the United States and Portugal. He lived for a while in Blackrock, County Louth, where he married Ysabele, the daughter of a Dutch diplomat.

Deighton does not like giving interviews, and these have been rare throughout his life; he also avoids appearing at literary festivals. He says that he does not enjoy being a writer and that "The best thing about writing books is being at a party and telling some pretty girl you write books, the worst thing is sitting at a typewriter and actually writing the book." After completing the Faith, Hope and Charity trilogy he decided to take a year off writing; at the end of the period, he decided that writing was "a mug's game" that he did not miss and did not have to do.

Works

Novels
According to the film and media historian Alan Burton, The IPCRESS File along with John le Carré's The Spy Who Came In from the Cold, "changed the nature of British spy fiction" as it brought in "a more insolent, disillusioned and cynical style to the espionage story". The academic George Grella considers Deighton's novels to be "stylish, witty [and] well-crafted", while providing "a convincingly detailed picture of the world of espionage while carefully examining the ethics and morality of that world".

The academic Clive Bloom considers that after Funeral in Berlin was published in 1964, Deighton "established a place for himself ... in the front rank of the spy genre, along with Graham Greene, Ian Fleming and John le Carré". Deighton's later works were less oblique than the earlier ones, and had, according to Bloom, "more subtlety and deeper characterization". Oliver Buckton, the professor of literature, also considers Deighton to be in the forefront of post-war spy writers. The crime writer and poet Julian Symons writes that "[t]he constant crackle of his dialogue makes Deighton a kind of poet of the spy story".

Grella considers Deighton to be "the angry young man of the espionage novel", with the central characters of his main novels—the unnamed protagonist from the IPCRESS series and Bernard Samson from the nine novels in which he appears—both working class, cynical and streetwise, in contrast to the upper class and ineffective seniors in their respective novels.

Cookery books
Deighton also wrote five cookery books, and wrote and drew the cookstrips in The Observer for four years. Several of the strips are pinned up in the background of the film set of Harry Palmer's kitchen in The Ipcress File. In January 2015 Deighton created 12 new cookstrips which were printed monthly in the Observer Food Magazine.

History books
Deighton began writing works of history after being advised to by the historian A. J. P. Taylor. His first work on the Second World War was Fighter, published in 1977. The book was well received by readers and critics, although it was "censured by some for including interviews with German participants", according to the journalist Jake Kerridge. Taylor wrote the introduction for the book, describing it as a "brilliant analysis"; Albert Speer, once the Minister of Armaments for Adolf Hitler, thought it "an excellent, most thorough examination. I read page after page with fascination".

Blitzkrieg, his history of the rise of the Nazis and the fall of France, has a foreword written by General Walter Nehring, Chief of Staff to General Heinz Guderian. His final history book is Blood, Tears and Folly: An Objective Look at World War II, which examined the events of the war up until 1942.

Adaptations
Several of Deighton's novels have been adapted as films, which include The Ipcress File, Funeral in Berlin, Billion Dollar Brain and Spy Story. All feature the Deighton character who was unnamed in the books but was given the full name "Harry Palmer" for the films; the producer for two of the three films, Harry Saltzman, came up with the name. Two television films also featured Palmer: Bullet to Beijing (1995) and Midnight in Saint Petersburg (1996); they were not based on Deighton's stories. All the films except Spy Story feature Michael Caine as Palmer.

The first trilogy of his Bernard Samson novel series was made into a thirteen-part television series by Granada Television in 1988. Although Quentin Tarantino expressed interest in filming the trilogy, the project was not forthcoming. The nine Samson novels were in pre-production with Clerkenwell Films in 2013, with a script by Simon Beaufoy.

In 2017 the BBC adapted Deighton's novel SS-GB for a five-part TV miniseries, broadcast in one-hour episodes; Sam Riley played the lead role of Detective Superintendent Douglas Archer. In 1995 BBC Radio 4 broadcast a "real time" dramatisation of Bomber. The drama threaded through the station's unchangeable schedule of news and current affairs from early morning to midnight.

Legacy and influence
Deighton's work has been acknowledged by the thriller writer Jeremy Duns as being an influence on his own work. In Letters from Burma, the politician Aung San Suu Kyi mentions reading Deighton's books, while under house arrest. Suu Kyi wrote that she was passionate about Arthur Conan Doyle's tales of Sherlock Holmes and the spy novels of le Carré and Deighton. When asked by Christie's about his love for Indian art and how he started his collection, the writer V. S. Naipaul credited Deighton. "I met Len Deighton, the thriller writer, at dinner many years ago. He demonstrated to me that Indian art could really be approachable. I bought from ... Maggs because of Len Deighton pushing me onto [them] as being a very fair dealer, saying that they do not charge you much more than they should. That's a marvellous thing to be told".

Deighton's 1970 novel Bomber was listed in Anthony Burgess's work Ninety-nine Novels, as one of the 99 best novels in English since 1939. Bomber, the third album of the rock group Motörhead, was named after the novel, as the band's singer, Lemmy, was reading it at the time.

Notes and references

Notes

References

Books

Broadcast media

Journals

News media

Websites

External links

 The Deighton Dossier – website about Len Deighton
 
 

1929 births
Living people
20th-century British novelists
20th-century Royal Air Force personnel
Alumni of Saint Martin's School of Art
Alumni of the Royal College of Art
British alternative history writers
British historical novelists
British male novelists
British male screenwriters
British military historians
British military writers
British spy fiction writers
Flight attendants
Historians of World War II
Members of the Detection Club
People educated at St Marylebone Grammar School
People educated at William Ellis School
People from Marylebone
People of the British Overseas Airways Corporation
Writers who illustrated their own writing